Parent and child or child and parent usually refers to a parent and child (infant, toddler, youth, adolescent) or family. It may also refer to any abstract concept in which one element (the child) is derived from or associated to another element (the parent):

oya-ko rocks, or "parent-and-child", a pair of rock formations offshore from Samani, Hokkaido, Japan
oyakodon, or "parent-and-child donburi", a Japanese rice bowl dish
process (computing), which may have a parent process and one or more child processes created using a fork
tree (data structure), which may consist of parent and child nodes

Other
Scholastic Parent & Child, a magazine
Child and Parent Resource Institute, in London, Ontario, Canada
Parent–child interaction therapy
Parent-Child Interaction Assessment-II